Barnaby David Waterhouse Thompson is a British film director and producer. He is best known for producing Wayne's World, Spice World, Kevin & Perry Go Large and An Ideal Husband, as well as co-directing the St Trinians films. He founded Fragile Films and ran the iconic Ealing Studios for fourteen years.

Early life and education
Thompson was born in London to parents who both worked in radio. He went to St. Paul's School and graduated from Oxford University with a degree in theology and philosophy.

Career

Upon leaving university, Thompson and two friends travelled to Pakistan and Afghanistan, armed only with a book called 'How to Make a Film.' The trio spent three months capturing seventeen rolls of film and, upon their return, sold Refugees of Faith, a documentary about the 3.5 million refugees living in Pakistan, to Channel Four.

Thompson founded World's End Productions and went on to direct documentaries A Sense Of Wonder (Channel Four/RTE), about the Catholic pilgrimages in the West of Ireland, Singing For Your Supper (BBC/RTE), about a busking festival in Clonakilty, Co.Cork, The Thin Blue Line (ITV), about stress in the Police force, and Kiss The Sky, a film about Jimi Hendrix for the South Bank Show, which won a silver medal at the New York Film Festival. He produced a short film, Dear Rosie, directed by Peter Cattaneo and written by Peter Morgan, which was nominated for an Oscar and a BAFTA.

Thompson moved to New York in 1990 to join Saturday Night Live's Lorne Michaels, who had offered him a job running his new movie division. The first film they made together, Wayne's World, starring Mike Myers and Dana Carvey, was number one at the U.S. Box Office for 5 weeks.  Further number one movies followed: Coneheads, starring Dan Aykroyd; Wayne's World 2, on which he was also second unit director; and Tommy Boy, starring Chris Farley and David Spade.

Returning to England, Thompson founded Fragile Films in 1996 with Uri Fruchtmann. Their first film was the international hit Spice World, for which he again directed 2nd unit. This was followed by the BAFTA and Golden Globe nominated An Ideal Husband - the closing film at the Cannes Film Festival - and the UK hit Kevin & Perry Go Large. These were followed by British comedies High Heels and Low Lifes, starring Minnie Driver and Michael Gambon, and Lucky Break, directed by Peter Cattaneo, starring James Nesbitt, Bill Nighy and Timothy Spall.

In 2000 Thompson, Fruchtmann, Harry Handelsman and John Kao bought Ealing Studios, the oldest film studio in the world, which Thompson ran as Head Of Studios for the next 14 years. in 2002, a TV comedy division was started that gave many comedians their first break, including Jimmy Carr, Sharon Horgan, Miranda Hart, Alice Lowe, Steve Oram, Paul King, Ben Willbond and Damon Beesley.

Thompson continued to produce films: The Importance of Being Earnest starring Rupert Everett, Colin Firth, Reese Witherspoon and Judi Dench; Imagine Me & You, a German-British romantic comedy starring Matthew Goode and Lena Headey and directed by Ol Parker; Valiant, the first CGI movie made in the UK starring Ewan McGregor and Ricky Gervais; Dorian Gray, starring Firth, Ben Barnes and Rebecca Hall; and Easy Virtue, with Firth, Kristin Scott Thomas and Jessica Biel.

Thompson co-directed St Trinians with frequent collaborator Oliver Parker in 2007. The film, starring Everett, Firth, Russell Brand, Gemma Arterton, Paloma Faith and Juno Temple, became one of the top 10 British independent movies in the UK. The 2009 sequel, St Trinian's 2: The Legend of Fritton's Gold, joined it in the list of top British films. At the time, Thompson had produced and / or directed 5 of the top 20 British independent movies in the UK of all time.

Since then, he has continued to produce movies: Kids in Love, starring Will Poulter and Cara Delevingne; Nina, starring Zoe Saldana and David Oyelowo; and Sundance hit The D Train, with Jack Black and James Marsden.

Thompson stepped down from running Ealing in 2014 and has now returned to Fragile Films, where he continues to direct and produce films and TV. He was Executive Producer on the critically acclaimed Maigret Sets a Trap, starring Rowan Atkinson, based on the Georges Simenon novels, which was broadcast by ITV at Easter 2016. Three further films followed - Maigret’s Dead Man, Night At The Crossroads and Maigret in Montmartre.

In 2019, Thompson was the Executive Producer on the UK hit, Fisherman's Friends, about the sea shanty singing Cornish fisherman.

In 2019, he directed and produced Pixie, starring Olivia Cooke, Ben Hardy, Daryl McCormack, Colm Meaney, Dylan Moran and Alec Baldwin, which will be released by Paramount in the UK and Ireland.

Personal life
Thompson has been married to American writer, Christina Robert, since 1991. They have two children.

Filmography

As a producer
Witness in the War Zone (assistant producer, 1987).
Dear Rosie (short film, 1991).
Wayne's World (associate producer, 1992).
Coneheads (co-producer, 1993).
Wayne's World 2 (co-producer, 1993).
Lassie (co-producer, 1994).
Tommy Boy (co-producer, 1995).
Kids in the Hall: Brain Candy (co-producer, 1996).
Spice World (1997).
An Ideal Husband (1999).
Kevin & Perry Go Large (2000).
High Heels and Low Lifes (2001).
Lucky Break (2001).
The Importance of Being Earnest (2002).
Hope Springs (2003).
Valiant (executive producer, 2005).
Imagine Me & You (2005).
Alien Autopsy (2006).
Fade to Black (2006).
I Want Candy (2007).
St Trinian's (2007).
Easy Virtue (2008).
Dorian Gray (2009).
From Time to Time (2009).
St Trinian's 2: The Legend of Fritton's Gold (2009).
Burke & Hare (2010).
Nina (2013)
D-Train (2015)
Maigret Sets a Trap (2016)
Kids In Love (2016)
Maigret's Dead Man (TV Movie) (2016) 
Maigret: Night At The Crossroads (TV Movie) (2017) 
 Maigret In Montmartre (TV Movie) (2017) 
 Fisherman's Friend (2019) 
 Pixie (2020)

As a director
Refugees Of Faith (1984) 
 A Sense Of Wonder (1986) 
"Singing For Your Supper" (1988)
"The Thin Blue Line" (1988)
"Kiss the Sky" (1989)
St Trinian's (2007).
St Trinian's 2: The Legend of Fritton's Gold (2009).
 Pixie (2020)

References

Living people
Year of birth missing (living people)
Alumni of the University of Oxford
English film producers
Alumni of Regent's Park College, Oxford